The 2013–14 season saw Alloa Athletic compete in the Scottish Championship where they finished in 8th position with 40 points.

Results
Alloa Athletic's score comes first

Legend

Scottish Championship

Scottish Cup

Scottish League Cup

Scottish Challenge Cup

Final league table

References

Alloa Athletic F.C. seasons
Alloa Athletic